Bi Jinhao (Chinese: 毕津浩; born 5 January 1991) is a professional Chinese football player who currently plays for Shanghai Shenhua in the Chinese Super League.

Club career
Born in Dalian, Bi joined Dalian Shide's youth academy when he was still a schoolboy, where he initially started his career as a forward. At his time with their youth academy he was sent out to Dalian Shide's satellite team Dalian Shide Siwu, who played as a foreign team in Singapore's S.League in the 2008 league season. Upon his return to Dalian Shide he was unable to break into the senior team and moved abroad to Portugal's Segunda Divisão side Boavista in 2010 as a youth player. He joined Terceira Divisão club Leça FC in January 2011 and he would make his debut on 22 January in a 1-1 draw against GD Joane, which was then followed by his first goal for club on 20 February in a 2-1 victory against CD Candal.

Bi returned to China in the summer of 2011 and sought a trial with Chinese Super League side Henan Jianye in July, where despite an unimpressive trial the management still decided to offer him a contract believing he had potential as a future prospect. Throughout the rest of the season Bi was included in the club's reserve team until the following season he was included in the senior team where he made his début on 13 May 2012, in a 2-1 away defeat against Guangzhou R&F where he also scored his first goal for the club. Despite his goalscoring debut he was unable to score in any of his following outings as the club suffered relegation to the second tier at the end of the 2012 campaign. Despite being part of the squad that won immediate promotion back into the top tier the next season Bi still failed to establish himself as a centre forward, scoring one goal throughout the campaign and none in the following 2014 Chinese Super League campaign. The club's manager Jia Xiuquan decided transition Bi into a centre back, which seemed to transform the player as he established himself at the heart of the club's defence and helped guide them to fifth within the league at the end of the 2015 league season, which resulted in selection for the Chinese national team in August 2015.

On 15 January 2016, Bi transferred to fellow Chinese Super League side Shanghai Shenhua. He made his debut for the club in a league game against Yanbian Funde F.C. on 5 March 2016, which resulted in a 1-1 draw. Despite a slow start to his career at the club he would start to establish himself as a regular within the team and he extended his contract with the club for five years on 19 November 2017. He would repay the club by going on to win the 2017 Chinese FA Cup against local rivals Shanghai SIPG. Bi suffered from subarachnoid hemorrhage on 11 April 2018. After a year out of the game Bi would return on 10 March 2019 in a league game against Hebei China Fortune F.C. in a 2-1 defeat. As the season progressed he gradually started to become a regular within the team again and go on to win the 2019 Chinese FA Cup with the club.

International career
Bi made his debut for the Chinese national team on 17 November 2015 in a 0-0 draw against Hong Kong in the 2018 FIFA World Cup qualification, coming on as a substitute for Wu Lei in the 81st minute.

Career statistics 
Statistics accurate as of match played 3 December 2020.

Honours

Club
Henan Jianye
 China League One: 2013
Shanghai Shenhua
Chinese FA Cup: 2017, 2019

References

External links
 
 

1991 births
Living people
Association football forwards
Chinese footballers
Footballers from Dalian
Singapore Premier League players
Henan Songshan Longmen F.C. players
Leça F.C. players
Shanghai Shenhua F.C. players
Chinese expatriate footballers
Expatriate footballers in Portugal
Chinese Super League players
China League One players
Chinese expatriate sportspeople in Portugal
China international footballers